Rectiplanes is a genus of sea snails, marine gastropod mollusks in the family Turridae, the turrids.

Species
Species within the genus Rectiplanes include:

 Rectiplanes delicatus (Okutani & Iwahori, 1992)

References

External links
  Bartsch, P, Some turrid mollusks of Monterey Bay and vicinity; Proceedings of the Biological Society of Washington, v. 57 p. 57-68

Turridae
Monotypic gastropod genera